The 1998 Waldbaum's Hamlet Cup was a men's tennis tournament played on Hard courts in Long Island, United States that was part of the International Series of the 1995 ATP Tour. It was the tenth edition of the tournament and was held from 21–27 August 1998.

Seeds
Champion seeds are indicated in bold text while text in italics indicates the round in which those seeds were eliminated.

Draw

Finals

Top half

Bottom half

References

Singles
Connecticut Open (tennis)
1995 Waldbaum's Hamlet Cup